Francisco Salamone (June 5, 1897August 8, 1959) was an Argentine architect of Italian descent who, between 1936 and 1940, during the Infamous Decade, built more than 60 municipal buildings with elements of Art Deco style in 25 rural communities on the Argentine Pampas within the Buenos Aires Province. These buildings were some of the first examples of modern architecture in rural Argentina.

Life

Salamone's was born in the town of Leonforte, Sicily in 1897, son of Salvatore Salamone and Antonia D'Anna.  After leaving the Otto Krause Technical School in Buenos Aires he continued his studies in the National University of Córdoba where he graduated in 1917 with a degree in architecture and civil engineering.

Salamone married Adolfina Croft, the daughter of the Austria-Hungarian Vice-consul in Bahia Blanca, Argentina, with whom he had four children: Ricardo, Roberto, Ana Maria and Stella Maris.  During Manuel Fresco's term, a conservative politician who was governor of the Province of Buenos Aires during the period 1936-1940, Salamone built more than 70 municipal buildings. His designs were a notable and very personal combination of Art Deco functionalism, Italian Futurism on a vast scale.  The use of reinforced concrete made it possible to construct buildings to a height that at that time made them symbols of municipal power and authority.

The rural towns in which Salamone's buildings appeared  were either frontier towns, built at the end of the nineteenth century on the edge of Indian territory, or were situated at regular intervals along newly built rail links. These towns were named after the colonels and generals who led the Conquest of the Desert and engineers who pioneered the building of the railways in this part of the Province.

In the 1950s, Salamone  designed several condominiums in Rationist style. He died on 8 August 1959, relatively forgotten, but leaving behind him a monumental architectural inheritance on the Argentine pampas.  He was buried in Recoleta Cemetery and later transferred to Cemetery Jardin de Paz.

Buildings
Salamone's work comprised three types of municipal buildings:

Town Halls: these are characterised by their massive proportions and high tower, taller than the local church tower, to symbolise the advance of civilisation over the Pampas and recalled both the medieval palazzi comunali and the designs of Benito Mussolini's Italy. These buildings were clearly intended to be the centre of urban life.  Examples are to be found in Carlos Pellegrini, Alberti, Carhué, Guamini, Adolfo Alsina, Laprida, Rauch, Balcarce, Tornquist, Puán, Chillar, Saldungaray, Gonzales Chaves and Coronel Pringles.
Cemetery Portals: these were also characterised by their massive proportions. Examples can be found in Saldungaray, Laprida, Azul, Salliqueló and Balcarce.
Slaughterhouses: these are functional in design, on the outskirts of towns, and have become obsolete with the introduction of modern butchery techniques and the advent of cold-storage plants.  Examples can be found in Tres Lomas, Balcarce, Carhué, Guaminí, Coronel Pringles (whose tower is in the form of the blade of a knife), Azul, Laprida, Vedia, Villa Epecuén, Salliqueló, Chillar and Carlos Pelegrini.

Works

City halls

Slaughterhouses

Cemetery portals

References
Alberto Bellucci, Monumental Art Deco in the Pampas: The Urban Art of Francisco Salamone, J. Decorative & Propaganda Arts, Argentine Theme Issue, 1992.
Photos and opinions by Leandro Aguirre
Tom Shaw & Edward Shaw, Salamone, La Consagración. Monumental Art Deco En Las Pampas 1997-2007, El Centro Cultural Borges, Buenos Aires, 2007.

External links

Francisco Salamone Repository
Official Bio Film Mundo Salamone (by Ezequiel Hilbert)
Official Salamone Music
Photo gallery featuring Salamone's buildings
Web with documentaries about Francisco Salamone
Documentary film "Las minas del rey Salamone" (in Spanish)
Documentary film "Salamone Superstar" (in Spanish)
'''France/isco Salamone Fausto Giovannardi (in italian)

1897 births
1959 deaths
People from the Province of Enna
Italian emigrants to Argentina
Architects from Buenos Aires
20th-century Argentine engineers
Burials at La Recoleta Cemetery
Argentine civil engineers